The 2019 AMJ Campbell Shorty Jenkins Classic was held September 10 to 15 in Cornwall, Ontario. The total purse for the event was $59,000 for the Men's and $34,500 for the Women's.

In the Men's final, John Epping defeated Brad Jacobs 5–3 in an all Ontario matchup. In the Women's final, Jennifer Jones defeated Tracy Fleury 6–4 in an all Manitoba affair.

Men

Teams

The teams are listed as follows:

Round-robin standings

Final round-robin standings

Round-robin results
All draw times are listed in Eastern Time (UTC−05:00).

Draw 1
Tuesday, September 10, 20:00

Draw 2
Wednesday, September 11, 18:30

Draw 3
Wednesday, September 11, 21:00

Draw 4
Thursday, September 12, 08:00

Draw 5
Thursday, September 12, 10:45

Draw 6
Thursday, September 12, 13:30

Draw 7
Thursday, September 12, 16:15

Draw 8
Thursday, September 12, 19:00

Draw 9
Thursday, September 12, 21:30

Draw 10
Friday, September 13, 08:00

Draw 11
Friday, September 13, 10:45

Draw 12
Friday, September 13, 13:30

Draw 13
Friday, September 13, 16:15

Draw 14
Friday, September 13, 19:00

Draw 15
Friday, September 13, 21:30

Draw 16
Saturday, September 14, 08:00

Draw 17
Saturday, September 14, 10:45

Draw 18
Saturday, September 14, 13:30

Draw 19
Saturday, September 14, 16:15

Tiebreakers
Saturday, September 14, 19:00

Saturday, September 14, 21:30

Playoffs

Source:

Quarterfinals
Sunday, September 15, 09:00

Semifinals
Sunday, September 15, 12:30

Final
Sunday, September 15, 15:30

Women

Teams

The teams are listed as follows:

Round-robin standings

Final round-robin standings

Round-robin results
All draw times are listed in Eastern Time (UTC−05:00).

Draw 1
Tuesday, September 10, 20:00

Draw 2
Wednesday, September 11, 18:30

Draw 3
Wednesday, September 11, 21:00

Draw 4
Thursday, September 12, 08:00

Draw 5
Thursday, September 12, 10:45

Draw 6
Thursday, September 12, 13:30

Draw 7
Thursday, September 12, 16:15

Draw 8
Thursday, September 12, 19:00

Draw 9
Thursday, September 12, 21:30

Draw 10
Friday, September 13, 08:00

Draw 11
Friday, September 13, 10:45

Draw 12
Friday, September 13, 13:30

Draw 13
Friday, September 13, 16:15

Draw 14
Friday, September 13, 19:00

Draw 15
Friday, September 13, 21:30

Draw 16
Saturday, September 14, 08:00

Draw 17
Saturday, September 14, 10:45

Draw 18
Saturday, September 14, 13:30

Playoffs

Source:

Quarterfinals
Saturday, September 14, 19:00

Sunday, September 15, 09:00

Semifinals
Sunday, September 15, 12:30

Final
Sunday, September 15, 15:30

References

External links
Men's Event
Women's Event

2019 in Canadian curling
Curling in Ontario
September 2019 sports events in Canada
2019 in Ontario
AMJ Campbell Shorty Jenkins Classic